Turbinicarpus viereckii is a species of plant in the family Cactaceae.

It is endemic to Tamaulipas, Nuevo León and San Luis Potosí states in northeastern Mexico.

Its natural habitat is hot deserts.

References

Sources

External links
 
 

viereckii
Cacti of Mexico
Endemic flora of Mexico
Flora of Nuevo León
Flora of San Luis Potosí
Flora of Tamaulipas
Least concern plants
Taxonomy articles created by Polbot